Microlipophrys caboverdensis is a species of marine fish in the family Blenniidae, the combtooth blennies. It is endemic to Cape Verde, eastern central Atlantic Ocean. The species was named and described as Lipophrys caboverdensis by Peter Wirtz and Hans Bath in 1989. Its common name in Portuguese and Capeverdean Creole is "mané-cabeça".

Description
This species grows to a length of  TL. It is an oviparous species; the eggs are attached to the substrate with a filamentous adhesive pad.

References

Further reading

 Nelson, J.: Fishes of the World, 3rd ed.. New York, USA: John Wiley and Sons., 1994

caboverdensis
Marine fauna of West Africa
Endemic vertebrates of Cape Verde
Fish described in 1989
Taxa named by Peter Wirtz
Taxa named by Hans Bath